Małgorzata Białecka (born 2 April 1988 in Gdynia) is a Polish windsurfer, In her career she won the Windsurfing World Championships in 2016. She competed at 2016 Olympic Games where she placed 14th.

Achievements

References

1988 births
Living people
Polish windsurfers
Female windsurfers
Sportspeople from Gdynia
Sailors at the 2016 Summer Olympics – RS:X
Olympic sailors of Poland
Universiade medalists in sailing
Universiade bronze medalists for Poland
Medalists at the 2011 Summer Universiade
RS:X class world champions